The 2010 Three National Figure Skating Championships included the Czech Republic, Slovakia, and Poland. The event was held 18–20 December 2009 at the MOSiR Cieszyn in Cieszyn, Poland. Medals were awarded in the disciplines of men's singles, ladies' singles, pair skating, and ice dancing on the senior, junior, and novice levels.

The three national championships were held simultaneously and the results were then split by country. The top three skaters from each country formed their national podiums. This was the fourth consecutive season that the Czech and Slovak Championships were held simultaneously, and the second in which Poland also participated.

In the senior pairs event, Kemp / King of United Kingdom and Sergeeva / Glebov of Estonia competed as guest skaters.

Medals summary

Czech Republic

Slovakia

Poland

Senior results

Men

Ladies

Pairs

Ice dancing

Junior results

Ice dancing

Novice results

Ice dancing

Pre-novice results

Ice dancing

External links
 2010 Three National Championships results

2009 in figure skating
Czech, Slovak, And Polish Figure Skating Championships, 2010
Czech Figure Skating Championships
Slovak Figure Skating Championships
Polish Figure Skating Championships
2009 in Polish sport
2009 in Czech sport
2009 in Slovak sport
Czech Republic–Slovakia relations